Tigershark is a 1987 action film directed by Emmett Alston and starring Mike Stone, John Quade, and Pamela Bryant. Its plot concerns a martial arts instructor who sets out to rescue his girlfriend who is being held for ransom by a South American warlord.

External links
 

1987 films
Philippine martial arts films
1987 action films
Films directed by Emmett Alston
1987 martial arts films
Films shot in the Philippines
1980s English-language films
American martial arts films
1980s American films